Dar Caïd Nessim Samama is one of the palaces of the medina of Tunis.

Localization 

It is located on the El Mechnaka Street near El Kallaline, Bab Cartagena and Hafsia.

History 
The qaid of Jews and treasurer of the bey of Tunis, Nessim Samama, built this palace in 1860.

In 1881, the Alliance Israélite Universelle transformed it into a school for girls.

References

External links 
 

Caid Nessim Samama
Houses completed in 1860